Season of Mist is an independent record label and record distributor with subsidiaries in France and the United States. The record label was founded in 1996 by Michael S. Berberian in Marseille, France. From the start releasing black metal, pagan metal, and death metal records, the label moved on to releasing albums of avant-garde metal, gothic metal and punk bands as well. The label has two offices, one in Marseille, France and one in Philadelphia, Pennsylvania.

Music
From the beginning, Season of Mist focused on releasing more extreme metal records by stylistically diverse bands like Oxiplegatz, Bethzaida and Kampfar. With the signing of Norwegian legends Mayhem in 1999, the label's profile clearly shifted towards black metal and attracted internationally renowned artists like Carpathian Forest, Rotting Christ, Arcturus, and Solefald, with the latter two representing a marked progressive and avant-garde side to Season of Mist.

While staying close to its black metal roots with the creation of the Season of Mist Underground Activists division in 2007, the label widened its musical range and added to its black, death, doom (Saint Vitus) and thrash metal roster bands playing progressive death metal (Morbid Angel, Cynic, Atheist, Gnostic, Gonin-ish), sludge (Kylesa, Outlaw Order Black Tusk), industrial metal (Genitorturers, The CNK, Punish Yourself), hard rock (Ace Frehley), gothic rock (Christian Death), mathcore (The Dillinger Escape Plan, Psykup), garage rock (1969 Was Fine), groove metal (Dagoba, Eths, Trepalium, Black Comedy) and metalcore (Eyeless, The Arrs).

History
Season of Mist was formed in 1996, while founder Michael S. Berberian was completing his scholarships in "International Economics Sciences"  initially, according to Berberian, to avoid the compulsory national military service in France. Since his graduation the label has become a full-time job for Michael and achieved a steady growth with Season of Mist now employing 20 staff members. In 2002 Season of Mist also started out as a distributor for the French territory, which includes other metal labels like Spinefarm Records or Napalm Records on their roster.

Season of Mist's name originates from A Midsummer Night's Dream, the play by William Shakespeare.

Roster

 1349
 ABBATH
 Alkaloid
 Altarage
 Anciients
 Archspire
 Atheist
 Auðn
 Baptism
 Barishi
 Benighted
 Beyond Creation
 Bizarrekult 
 Black Tusk
 Black Cobra
 Cannabis Corpse
 Carach Angren
 The Casualties
 Chaostar
 Cloak
 Complete Failure
 Craft
 Crippled Black Phoenix
 Darkspace
 Deathspell Omega
 Defiled
 Départe
 Der Weg einer Freiheit
 Deströyer 666
 Disperse
 Dodecahedron
 Drudkh

 Earth Electric
 Emptiness
 Endstille
 Engel
 Enthroned
 Esben and the Witch
 Esoteric
 Eternal Gray
 Eths
 Foscor
 Funeral
 Gaahls Wyrd
 Gaerea 
 Garmarna
 George Kollias
 Gonin-ish
 Gorguts
 Grave Desecrator
 The Great Old Ones
 Hark
 Hate Eternal
 Hegemon
 Heilung
 Hell Militia
 Hierophant
 Hooded Menace
 Imperium Dekadenz
 Impure Wilhelmina
 Incantation

 KEN Mode
 Kontinuum
 Leng Tch'e
 The Lion's Daughter
 Mark Deutrom (ex-Melvins)
 Mayhem
 Merrimack
 Misery Index
 Necronomicon
 Necrowretch
 Necrophagia
 Ne Obliviscaris
 Nidingr
 Nightbringer
 Nightmarer
 Nocturnal Graves
 Numenorean
 Obsidian Kingdom
 Replacire
 Revenge
 Ritual Killer
 River Black
 Rotten Sound
 Rotting Christ

 Saint Vitus
 Sarah Longfield
 Septicflesh
 Shape of Despair
 Sinistro
 Skuggsjá
 Shining
 Sólstafir
 Sons of Balaur
 Strigoi
 Sylvaine
 This Gift Is A Curse
 Thy Catafalque
 Tsjuder
 Ulsect
 Venomous Concept
 Vévaki
 Vipassi
 Virvum
 Vulture Industries
 Weedeater
 Wildlights
 Windswept
 Withered
 Wormed
 Zhrine
 Zuriaake

North American roster
Bands signed on a license deal with Season of Mist for exclusive release in North America.
 Abysmal Dawn – American death metal
 Astarte – Greek black metal
 Beherit – Finnish black metal
 Deathspell Omega – French black metal
 Dying Fetus – American death metal
 Eluveitie – Swiss folk metal
 Enslaved – Norwegian progressive black metal
 Finntroll – Finnish folk black metal
 Forgotten Tomb – Italian black metal
 Legion of the Damned – Dutch thrash metal
 Moonsorrow – Finnish folk black metal
 Reverend Bizarre – Finnish doom metal
 Sadist – Italian technical death metal
 Shape of Despair – Finnish funeral doom metal
 Shining – Swedish black metal
 Sopor Aeternus – German darkwave
 The Gathering – Dutch atmospheric rock
 To Separate the Flesh from the Bones – Finnish grindcore
 Within Temptation – Dutch gothic metal

Distributed labels
Record companies distributed in France by Season of Mist.

 Accession
 Ad Noiseam
 Agonia Records
 Agua Recordings
 Alfa Matrix
 Ant-Zen
 Anticulture
 Ark Records
 Audioglobe
 Aura Mystique
 Avantgarde Music
 Basement Apes Records
 Black Flames
 Black Lotus Records
 Black Mark Production
 Black Rain/Noitekk
 Bones Brigade Records
 Candlelight/PlasticHead
 Cargo Records
 Code 666
 Cold Meat Industry
 Cold Spring
 Cruz del Sur
 Cyclic Law
 Cyclone Empire
 D8k Prod
 Danse Macabre
 Deadrock Industry/Customcore
 Deaf & Dumb Music
 Debemur Morti
 Demolition Records
 dependent
 Displeased Records
 Divine Comedy
 Drakkar Entertainment
 Dream Catcher
 Favored Nations
 Firebox Records
 GMR Music
 Great Dane Records
 GSR Records
 Hall of Sermon
 I For Us
 I Hate records
 La Chambre Froide
 Lifeforce Records
 M-Tronic
 Magic Circle Music
 Massacre Records
 Masterpiece Records
 Metal Blade/Silverdust
 Metal Mind Productions
 Metropolis Records
 Morbid Records
 Moribund Records
 Music Avenue
 Napalm Records
 Norma Evangelium Diaboli
 Northern Silence
 Nova Media/Alice In.../Bloodline/Minuswelt/Dancing Ferret/Pandaimonium
 Optical Sound
 Out of Line
 Painkiller Records
 People Like You
 Prikosnovénie
 Prophecy Productions
 Psychonaut Records
 Pulverised Records
 Rage of Achilles
 Repo Records
 Scarlet Records
 Sepulchral Production
 Several Bleeds/Rupture Music
 Shunu Records
 Sound Pollution
 Spinefarm
 Suburban Records
 Supernal Music
 Target Records
 Tatra Productions
 Tesco Organisation
 The End Records
 Trendkill Records
 Twilight Vertrieb
 Underclass
 Virusworx
 Von Jakhelln

References

External links
 

French independent record labels
American independent record labels
 
Black metal record labels
Doom metal record labels
Death metal record labels
Goth record labels
Industrial record labels
Companies based in Marseille
Companies based in Philadelphia
Heavy metal record labels